Thongvin Phomvihane (born 7 January 1938 in Viang Chan) is a Laotian politician and member of the Lao People's Revolutionary Party (LPRP). She is the former wife LPRP General Secretary Kaysone Phomvihane and mother to Xaysomphone Phomvihane. From 1988 to 1993 she served as the General Secretary of the Central Committee of the Lao People's Revolutionary Youth Union. 

She was elected to the LPRP Central Committee at the 3rd National Congress and retained her seat until the 5th National Congress.

References

Specific

Bibliography
Books:
 

Living people
1938 births
20th-century Laotian women politicians
20th-century Laotian politicians
Members of the 3rd Central Committee of the Lao People's Revolutionary Party
Members of the 4th Central Committee of the Lao People's Revolutionary Party
Lao People's Revolutionary Party politicians
Place of birth missing (living people)